Iramba is one of the six districts of the Singida Region of central Tanzania. It is bordered to the Northwest by the Shinyanga Region, to the North by Simiyu Region, to the east by the Mkalama District, to the South by Ikungi District and to the West by the Tabora Region. Its administrative seat is the town of Kiomboi.

According to the 2012 Tanzania National Census, the population of the new Iramba District was 236,282.

According to the 2002 Tanzania National Census, the population of the Iramba District was 368,131.

Language
The natives of the Iramba district are called 'Wanyiramba'(pl., singular: 'Mnyiramba'). Their mother tongue is Kinyiramba, though the majority can also speak Swahili.

Wards 2012

Wards 2002
The Iramba District was administratively divided into 34 wards:
Gumanga
Ibaga
Iguguno
Ilunda
Javane
Kaselya
Kengege
Kidaru
Kimpunda
Kinampanda
Kinyangiri
Kiomboi
Kirondatal
Kisana
Kisiriri
Kyengege
Mbelekese
Mpambala
Msingi (English meaning: Primary or Foundation)
Mtekente
Mtoa
Mwanga
Mwangeza
Ndago
Nduguti
Nkinto
Ntwike
Shati
Shelui
Timbwa
Tulya
Tumili
Ulemo
Urughu
Urugu
Usure
Uwanza

References

Sources
Iramba District Homepage for the 2002 Tanzania National Census
Tanzanian Government Directory Database

Districts of Singida Region